This is a list of flags used in Southern Rhodesia between 1890–1964 and 1979–1980 and Rhodesia between 1964 and 1979.  The evolution of Southern Rhodesia from a British South African Company concern, to a British Colony, then to a member of a Federal Government, then to a self-declared state is evident by the different flags used.

For flags after these dates see Flags of Zimbabwe.

National Flags

Vice-Regal and Presidential

Military Flags

Political flags

Town Flags

References

Rhodesia
Flags
flags